Cyril Renouf is an international lawn bowler from Jersey.

Bowls career
Renouf finished first in the individual standings at the 2009 European Team Championships and represented Jersey at the 2010 Commonwealth Games.

In 2007 he won the pairs and fours silver medals at the Atlantic Bowls Championships. Two years later in 2009 he won the fours bronze medal at the Atlantic Championships and in 2015 he won the fours gold medal at the Atlantic Bowls Championships.

Renouf became a British champion after winning the 2008 triples title, at the British Isles Bowls Championships, with Alan Shaw and John Rowcliffe.

In 2015, he won his third European Bowls Championships medal in Israel.

References

Jersey bowls players
Living people
Bowls players at the 2010 Commonwealth Games
Year of birth missing (living people)
Bowls European Champions